Mucuna pruriens is a tropical legume native to Africa and tropical Asia and widely naturalized and cultivated. Its English common names include monkey tamarind, velvet bean, Bengal velvet bean, Florida velvet bean, Mauritius velvet bean, Yokohama velvet bean, cowage, cowitch, lacuna bean, and Lyon bean.

The plant is notorious for the extreme itchiness it produces on contact, particularly with the young foliage and the seed pods. It also produces many medium-sized red swollen bumps along with the itching. It has agricultural and horticultural value and is used in herbalism.

Description

When the plant is young, it is almost completely covered with fuzzy hairs, but when older, it is almost completely free of hairs. The leaves are tripinnate, ovate, reverse ovate, rhombus-shaped or widely ovate. The sides of the leaves are often heavily grooved and the tips are pointy. In young specimens, both sides of the leaves have hairs.

The flower heads take the form of axially arrayed panicles. The sepals are longer or of the same length as the shuttles. The crown is purplish or white.

There is a ridge along its length and the husk is covered in loose, orange hairs that cause a severe itch if they contact skin. The pods carry up to seven seeds, which are shiny black or brown drift seeds. The hilum, the base of the funiculus (connection between placenta and plant seeds) is a surrounded by a significant arillus (fleshy seed shell). The dry weight of the seeds is /100 seeds.

Chemistry 
The seeds of the plant contain about 3.1–6.1% . An average of 52.11% degradation of  into damaging quinones and reactive oxygen species was found in seeds of M. pruriens varieties.

Taxonomy

Subspecies
Mucuna pruriens ssp. deeringiana (Bort) Hanelt
Mucuna pruriens ssp. pruriens

Varieties
 Mucuna pruriens var. hirsuta (Wight & Arn.) Wilmot-Dear
 Mucuna pruriens var. pruriens (L.) DC.
 Mucuna pruriens var. sericophylla
 Mucuna pruriens var. utilis (Wall. ex Wight) L.H.Bailey is the non-stinging variety grown in Honduras.

Itch-inducing properties

The hairs lining the seed pods contain serotonin and the protein mucunain, which cause severe itching when the pods are touched. The calyx below the flowers is also a source of itchy spicules and the stinging hairs on the outside of the seed pods are used in some brands of itching powder. Scratching the exposed area can spread the itching to other areas touched, which can cause blindness if in the area of the eyes. Once this happens, the subject tends to scratch vigorously and uncontrollably and for this reason the local populace in northern Mozambique refer to the beans as "mad beans" (feijões malucos). The seed pods are known as "Devil Beans" in Nigeria.

Uses

In many parts of the world, M. pruriens is used as an important forage, fallow and green manure crop. Since the plant is a legume, it fixes nitrogen and fertilizes soil. In Indonesia, particularly Java, the beans are eaten and widely known as 'Benguk'. The beans can also be fermented to form a food similar to tempeh and known as Benguk tempe or 'tempe Benguk'.

M. pruriens is a widespread fodder plant in the tropics. To that end, the whole plant is fed to animals as silage, dried hay or dried seeds. M. pruriens silage contains 11–23% crude protein, 35–40% crude fiber, and the dried beans 20–35% crude protein. It also has use in the countries of Benin and Vietnam as a biological control for problematic Imperata cylindrica grass. M. pruriens is said to not be invasive outside its cultivated area. However, the plant is invasive within conservation areas of South Florida, where it frequently invades disturbed land and rockland hammock edge habitats. Cooked fresh shoots or beans can also be eaten. Up to 88% of the  can be extracted from M. pruriens by boiling and soaking for approximately 48 hours. The efficiency of the process can be slightly improved by using approximately 0.25–0.50% sodium bicarbonate.

Traditional medicine

The plant and its extracts have long been used in tribal communities as an antidote for snakebite. More recently, its effects against bites by Naja (cobra), Echis (saw-scaled viper), Calloselasma (Malayan pit viper), and Bungarus (krait) species have been studied. It has been investigated as a treatment for Parkinson's disease due to its high  content, while the seeds have been recognized for their ability to significantly alleviate neurotoxicity associated with the condition.

The seeds have also been used for treating mood disorders, as well as for sexual dysfunction in Tibb-e-Unani and Ayurvedic medicine.

The dried leaves of M. pruriens are sometimes smoked.

See also
 Medicinal plants

References

External links

 Mucuna pruriens (U.S. Forest Service)
 www.hort.purdue.edu Crop Fact Sheets
 Mucuna pruriens (Tropical Forages)
 Mucuna pruriens protects against snakebite venom
 Mucuna pruriens var. utilis (Photos)
 Chemicals in: Mucuna pruriens (L.) DC. (Dr. Duke's Phytochemical and Ethnobotanical Databases)
 Lycaeum
 Mucuna pruriens a Comprehensive Review
 Mucuna pruriens Seed L-DOPA Content on the Basis of Seed Color
 Research Paper Showing Quantitative Phytochemical Analysis
 Mucuna pruriens (Kapikacchu, Atmagupta) entry in Caldecott

pruriens
Medicinal plants of Asia
Edible legumes
Forages
Nitrogen-fixing crops
Plants described in 1759
Flora of Nepal